Lucas Dos Santos Pinheiro (born 11 February 1994 in Manaus, Amazon, Brazil) is a black belt Brazilian Jiu Jitsu athlete who competes professionally for the Atos Jiu Jitsu Team in the United States.

Career 
Lucas Pinheiro is a 1st degree black belt student under BJJ legend André Galvão in San Diego, California. Pinheiro is also a former student of Faustino Neto (Mestre Pina) and Cícero Costha. He has earned important medals at the Brazilian National Jiu-Jitsu Championship as well as World Jiu-Jitsu Championship and is currently one of the top competitors in the Rooster and Light-featherweight divisions. In 2019, Pinheiro was ranked #9 over all weights by IBJJF in the No-Gi category.

Instructor lineage 

Mitsuyo Maeda → Carlos Gracie, Sr. → Osvaldo Alves → Faustino Neto → Carlos Holanda → Lucas Pinheiro

Championships and accomplishments

Grappling 

2014
  IBJJF Rio International Open
2015
  CBJJ Brazilian Nationals 
  UAEJJF Brazil National Pro
  IBJJF Austin International Open
  IBJJF World Championship 
  IBJJF Dallas International Open No-Gi
  IBJJF Austin International Open (absolute)
2016
  IBJJF San Antonio International Open
  IBJJF Pan American Championship
2017
  IBJJF American Nationals
  IBJJF American Nationals No-Gi
  IBJJF Austin International Open
  IBJJF Miami International Open No-Gi
  IBJJF Atlanta International Open
  IBJJF Dallas International Open
  IBJJF Dallas International Open No-Gi
  IBJJF Miami International Open
  IBJJF World Championship No-Gi
  IBJJF Pan American Championship
  IBJJF World Championship
  IBJJF Dallas International Open (absolute)
  IBJJF Austin International Open (absolute)
  IBJJF Austin International Open No-Gi (absolute)
2018
  IBJJF American Nationals
  IBJJF American Nationals No-Gi
  SJJIF World Championship 
  SJJIF World Championship No-Gi
  ACBJJ North American Championship
  ACBJJ Worlds Jiu Jitsu
  IBJJF Pan American Championship
2019
  IBJJF Pan American No-Gi
  IBJJF American Nationals No-Gi
  IBJJF Las Vegas International Open
  IBJJF Las Vegas International Open No-Gi
  IBJJF Austin International Open
  IBJJF Austin International Open No-Gi
  IBJJF Houston International Open
  F2W Featherweight 
  IBJJF American Nationals
2020
  IBJJF Houston International Open
  IBJJF Pan American Championship

See also

References

External links 
Lucas Pinheiro - Sport Jiu-Jitsu International Federation
Lucas Pinheiro in BJJ Heroes
Lucas Pinheiro Joins Atos Just Two Weeks Out From IBJJF 2018 Worlds
Pro Team Pro Team - Gameness.com
Lucas Pinheiro Defeats João Miyao “I Always Believed I Could Beat Him” - Jiu-Jitsu Times
Lucas Pinheiro Wins The No-Gi Pan Ams And Earns His Tenth Gold Medal Of The Season
Lucas Pinheiro Lends Opponent His Spare Gi... Then Submits Him! - Flograppling
Matches You Won't See Anywhere Else: Five Lightweight Super League - Flograppling
2-time No-Gi Pan champion Lucas Pinheiro now eyeing gold at No-Gi Worlds - GracieMag
After wins at Las Vegas Open, Lucas Pinheiro gears up for Pan and No-Gi Worlds - GracieMag
Lucas Pinheiro’s choke at the Austin Open - GracieMag
Lucas Pinheiro’s choke at the Houston Open light feather final - GracieMag
Seeking 10th gold medal of the season, Lucas Pinheiro trains hard for the No-Gi Pan - GracieMag
Following double gold at American Nationals, Lucas Pinheiro seeks Five Grappling title - GracieMag
Lucas Pinheiro wants to end the monopoly on the roosterweight division and win his first world BJJ title
After overcoming a serious injury in the lower back, Lucas Pinheiro seeks first world title
Lucas Pinheiro Seeks His First World Title After Car Accident

1994 births
Living people
Brazilian practitioners of Brazilian jiu-jitsu
American practitioners of Brazilian jiu-jitsu
People awarded a black belt in Brazilian jiu-jitsu